"Pillow Talk" is an episode of the BBC sitcom The Green Green Grass. It was first screened on 7 October 2005, as the fifth episode of the first season of the series.

Synopsis
Marlene is having sleeping problems, "...I don't like it round here, it's too quiet". Not even that bloody owl outside is helping her sleeping pattern, but one thing might – and only Boycie can provide that. That is until Boycie believes that Jed could do something different to help Mrs Boyce. Also in this episode, Tyler falls in love with his English teacher but she is having none of it.

Episode cast

Production, broadcast and reception

Writing
This episode was written by John Sullivan, writer of Only Fools and Horses. The whole of the first series was written entirely by John Sullivan.

Broadcast
During its original airing, the episode had a viewing audience of 6.63 million, in the 8:30pm timeslot it was shown. This is the same audiences that sitcoms such as My Family attract.

This episode has since been re-run on BBC1, BBC HD and GOLD. The show received one of the highest ratings of the week making it into the top thirty.

DVD release
The UK DVD was released on 23 October 2006. The release includes the 2005 Christmas Special, a short special entitled 'Grass Roots' and a short documentary on 'Rocky'.

Continuity
 Tyler attends his first day at his new school, with references made to his old school back in Peckham.
 Jed travels down to London for a farmers' convention.
 Boycie makes a reference to Trigger in this episode when he tells Tyler about his mates who hadn't got an education just went around sweeping the roads.

Notes
This episode marks the fourth in a story arc spanning several series in the form of the gay bull joke.

References

British TV Comedy Guide for The Green Green Grass
BARB viewing figures
The Green Green Grass at BBC Comedy
The Green Green Grass website
British Sitcom Guide for The Green Green Grass
The Green Green Grass at Only Fools and Horses website

2005 British television episodes
The Green Green Grass episodes